{{Infobox station
| name        = Kanazawa Station
| native_name = 金沢駅
| native_name_lang = ja
| type        = 
| mlanguage   = 
| style = JR West
| image       = 131108 Kanazawa Station Kanazawa Ishikawa pref Japan01s5.jpg
| alt         = 
| caption     = The Tsuzumi ("drum") Gate at JR Kanazawa Station East entrance
| other_name  = 
| address     = 1-1 Kinoshimbo-machi, Kanazawa City, Ishikawa Prefecture 920-0858
| country     = Japan
| coordinates = 
| distance    = 450.5 km from  
| operator    = 
| line        = 
| platforms   = 5 island platforms
| tracks      = 7
| connections =  Bus terminal
| structure   = 
| code        = 
| status      = Staffed (Midori no Madoguchi)
| website     = 
| opened      = 
| closed      = 
| former      =  
| passengers  = 22,668 daily (JR West)
| pass_year   =FY2016
| map_type    = Japan Ishikawa Prefecture#Japan Kanto Chubu Kansai#Japan
| services    = {{Adjstn|system=JR West|line=Hokuriku Shinkansen
|type1=Kagayaki|right1=Toyama|note-mid1={{SLL||#FFFACD}}
|type2=Hakutaka|right2=Shin-Takaoka|note-mid2=
|line9=Hokuriku|type9=Local|left9=Nishi-Kanazawa
}}
|other_services_header=Under construction
|other_services_collapsible=yes
|other_services=
}}

 is a major railway station in Kanazawa, Ishikawa, Japan, operated by West Japan Railway Company (JR West), the private railway operator Hokuriku Railroad, and the third-sector operator IR Ishikawa Railway.

Beneath a square in front of the JR station is Hokutetsu-Kanazawa Station, the terminal of the Hokuriku Railroad Asanogawa Line.

Lines
West Japan Railway Company (JR West):
Hokuriku Shinkansen
Hokuriku Main Line
Nanao Line (This line formally starts from Tsubata Station, but all the trains run straight into Kanazawa Station)
Hokuriku Railroad (Hokutetsu):
Asanogawa Line (Hokutetsu-Kanazawa Station)
 IR Ishikawa Railway
 IR Ishikawa Railway Line

Station layout

JR platforms
JR Kanazawa Station is elevated above street level, featuring three island platforms with one cut-out platform (for Track 4) on the Up (Toyama) side of the middle island platform, serving seven tracks in total. A large roof covers the station building, in order to prevent train stoppages due to accumulated snow within the station.

The Hokuriku Shinkansen platforms are adjacent to the east exit, between the Motenashi Dome and the conventional tracks. The shinkansen station has two island platforms serving four tracks.

{| border="1" cellspacing="0" cellpadding="3" frame="hsides" rules="rows"
|-
!style="width:40px" rowspan=3|1
| rowspan=3 | ■ Hokuriku Main Line
| rowspan=3 | (Up)
|■ Local
|-
| ■ Limited Express Thunderbird■ Sleeper Limited Express Nihonkai| for Fukui, 
|-
| ■ Limited Express Shirasagi| for Fukui, Tsuruga, 
|-
! rowspan=3|2
| rowspan=3 | ■ Hokuriku Main Line
| rowspan=3 | (Up)
|■ Local
| for Komatsu, Fukui
|-
| ■ Limited Express Thunderbird
| for Fukui, Tsuruga, Kyoto, Osaka
|-
|■ Limited Express Shirasagi
| for Fukui, Maibara, Nagoya
|-
! rowspan=4 |3
| rowspan=3 | ■ Hokuriku Main Line
| rowspan=3 | (Up)
| ■ Local
| for Komatsu, Fukui
|-
| ■ Limited Express Thunderbird
| for Fukui, Tsuruga, Kyoto, Osaka
|-
| ■ Limited Express Shirasagi
| for Fukui, Maibara, Nagoya
|-
| colspan=2 | ■ Nanao Line
| ■ Local
|-
! rowspan=2 | 4
| colspan=2 | ■ Nanao Line
| ■ Local
| for Hakui, Nanao, Wakuraonsen
|-
| ■ Hokuriku Main Line
| (Down)
| ■Local (Ainokaze Toyama Railway Line, IR Ishikawa Railway Line)
|-
! rowspan=4 |5
| rowspan=3 | ■ Hokuriku Main Line
| (Up)
| ■ Local■ Limited Express Oyasumi Express (operated by JR West)
| for Komatsu, Fukui
|-
| rowspan=2 | (Down)
| ■ Local (Ainokaze Toyama Railway Line, IR Ishikawa Railway Line)
| for Takaoka, Toyama
|-
|■ Overnight Express Noto (operated by JR West)
|-
| colspan=2 | ■ Nanao Line
| ■ Local
| for Hakui, Nanao, Wakuraonsen
|-
! rowspan=2 |6
| ■ Hokuriku Main Line
| (Down)
| ■ Local (Ainokaze Toyama Railway Line, IR Ishikawa Railway Line)
| for Takaoka, Toyama
|-
| colspan=2 | ■ Nanao Line
| ■ Local
| for Hakui, Nanao, Wakuraonsen
|-
! rowspan=3|7
| rowspan=2 | ■ Hokuriku Main Line
| rowspan=2 | (Down)
| ■ Local (Ainokaze Toyama Railway Line, IR Ishikawa Railway Line) ■ Limited Express Thunderbird (operated by JR West)■ Limited Express Shirasagi (operated by JR West)■ Limited Express Ohayō Express (operated by JR West)
| for Takaoka, Toyama
|-
|■ Sleeper Limited Express Nihonkai (operated by JR West)
|-
| colspan=2 | ■ Nanao Line
| ■ Local ■ Rapid Service■ Limited Express Thunderbird■ Limited Express Shirasagi
| for Hakui, Nanao, Wakuraonsen
|-
! 11-14
| ■ Hokuriku Shinkansen
|  
|  
| For Toyama, 
|}

The departure melody used on the Hokuriku Shinkansen platforms was composed by songwriter and producer Yasutaka Nakata, who was born in Kanazawa.

Hokutetsu platforms
The platforms for the Hokutetsu Asanogawa Line are located underground, below the JR West platforms.

Adjacent stations

History
The station opened on 1 April 1898. With the privatization of JNR on 1 April 1987, the station came under the control of JR West. The platforms for the Hokuriku Shinkansen opened on 14 March 2015.

From this date, Kanazawa Station will become the western terminus of the IR Ishikawa Railway Line of Ishikawa Prefecture.

Passenger statistics
In fiscal 2016, the JR West portion of the station was used by an average of 22,668 passengers daily (boarding passengers only).

Surrounding area

East exit 
Kanazawa Station Bus Terminal
Kanazawa Miyako Hotel
Hotel Nikko Kanazawa
Kanazawa Art Hall
ANA Crowne Plaza Kanazawa
Ishikawa Ongakudō

West exit 
JR Kanazawa Station West Building
Via Inn Kanazawa
Kanazawa Manten Hotel
Kanazawa Water and Energy Center

Bus services

East Exit

Gate 1
Hokutetsu bus Express bus service for Noto

Gate 2
Hokutetsu Highway Bus (Services are operated by Hokutetsu Bus and local companies from the destination areas.)
 For Tokyo (operated by Hokutetsu Bus and Nishi Tokyo Bus)
For Yokohama and Fujisawa (operated by Hokutetsu Bus and Enoden Bus)
For Nagoya (operated by Hokutetsu Bus and Meitetsu Bus, JR Tokai Bus, and West JR Bus)
For Osaka (operated by Hokutetsu Bus and Hankyu bus)
For Sendai (operated by Hokutetsu Bus and Miyagi Kotsu)
For Niigata (operated by Hokutetsu Bus and Niigata Kotsu)
For Toyama (operated by Hokutetsu Bus and Toyama Chihō Railway)
Nippon Chuo Bus
For Tokyo

Gate 3
Hokutetsu bus for Kanazawa Gakuin University and Hokuriku University

Gate 4
JR Bus for Fukumitsu Station and Tonami Station

Gate 5
Machi Bus for Central Kanazawa (operated by West JR Bus)
West JR Highway Bus (Some buses are operated by other operators)
Dream Kanazawa for Tokyo (operated with JR Bus Kanto )
Kanazawa Express for Tokyo (operated with JR Bus Kanto and Seibu Bus)
For Nagoya (daytime) (operated with JR Tokai Bus)
Hokuriku Dream Nagoya for Nagoya (night-time) (operated with JR Tokai Bus)
For Osaka (daytime)
For Osaka (via Fukui Station)
For Osaka (night-time)
For Toyama

Gate 6
 Hokutetsu Bus for Mount Utatsu and Kanazawa University

Gate 7

 Hokutetsu Bus for Kanazawa University High School (Route 20)

Gate 8
 Hokutetsu Bus for Kanazawa Institute of Technology

Gate 9
 Hokutetsu Bus for Kinjo University, Nonoichi City Hall, and Nonoichi Station

Gate 10
 Hokutetsu Bus for Kanazawa Gakuin University

Gate 11
 Hokutetsu Bus for Nishi-Kanazawa Station

West Exit

Gate 1
Keifuku Bus for Awara-Yunomachi Station (Seasonal)

Gate 2
 Hokutetsu Bus Routes 52 and 57

Gate 3
 Hokutetsu Bus Komatsu Airport Bus

Gate 4
 Hokutetsu Bus for Unoke Station

Gate 5
 Hokutetsu Bus for Nomachi Station, Kanazawa Gakuin University, and Kanazawa Seiryo University

Gate 6
 Hokutetsu Bus

Gate 7
West JR Bus

Gate 8
West JR Bus

Gallery

References

External links

Kanazawa Station (JR West official page) 

Stations of West Japan Railway Company
Railway stations in Ishikawa Prefecture
Buildings and structures in Kanazawa, Ishikawa
Railway stations in Japan opened in 1898
Hokuriku Main Line
IR Ishikawa Railway Line
Hokuriku Railroad Asanogawa Line